These 138 species belong to Dieuches, a genus of dirt-colored seed bugs in the family Rhyparochromidae.

Dieuches species

 Dieuches abundans Eyles, 1973
 Dieuches abyssiniae Eyles, 1973
 Dieuches africanus (Distant, 1918)
 Dieuches albomarginatus (Uhler, 1860)
 Dieuches albostriatus (Fabricius, 1803)
 Dieuches alternatus Horvath, 1889
 Dieuches annobonensis Eyles, 1973
 Dieuches annulatus (Signoret, 1860)
 Dieuches armatipes (Walker, 1872)
 Dieuches armipes (Fabricius, 1794)
 Dieuches basiceps Eyles, 1973
 Dieuches beviceps Eyles, 1973
 Dieuches braunsi Eyles, 1973
 Dieuches brevirostris Eyles, 1973
 Dieuches chinensis (Dallas, 1852)
 Dieuches coenosus (Stal, 1865)
 Dieuches coloratus (Distant, 1909)
 Dieuches consanguineus Distant, 1904
 Dieuches consimilis Distant, 1918
 Dieuches conspicuus Eyles, 1973
 Dieuches constrictus Eyles, 1973
 Dieuches crinitus Eyles, 1973
 Dieuches curvus Eyles, 1973
 Dieuches dasys Eyles, 1973
 Dieuches diabolus Eyles, 1973
 Dieuches discoguttatus (Distant, 1918)
 Dieuches distanti Bergroth, 1916
 Dieuches divergens Eyles, 1973
 Dieuches duplex Eyles, 1973
 Dieuches elgonensis Eyles, 1973
 Dieuches embolicus Deckert & Eyles, 2002
 Dieuches eminens Eyles, 1973
 Dieuches etemporalis Eyles, 1973
 Dieuches exiguus Eyles, 1973
 Dieuches expandens Eyles, 1973
 Dieuches exsertus Eyles, 1973
 Dieuches feai Eyles, 1973
 Dieuches femoralis Dohrn, 1860
 Dieuches flavipes Haglund, 1895
 Dieuches forbesii (Kirkaldy, 1899)
 Dieuches formosus Eyles, 1973
 Dieuches fuscans Distant, 1904
 Dieuches fuscus Reuter, 1887
 Dieuches gracilicrus Eyles, 1973
 Dieuches grandicus Gross & Scudder, 1963
 Dieuches herero Breddin, 1913
 Dieuches hirsutus Gross & Scudder, 1963
 Dieuches humilis Reuter, 1887
 Dieuches hypocritus Bergroth, 1915
 Dieuches inarmatus Eyles, 1973
 Dieuches incisus Eyles, 1973
 Dieuches indicus Eyles, 1973
 Dieuches insignis (Distant, 1904)
 Dieuches japonicus Hidaka & Eyles, 1968
 Dieuches junctus Eyles, 1973
 Dieuches kalungwisiensis Eyles, 1973
 Dieuches kansuensis Lindberg, 1934
 Dieuches lateralis Signoret, 1863
 Dieuches laticeps Eyles, 1973
 Dieuches leucoceras (Walker, 1872)
 Dieuches levis Eyles, 1973
 Dieuches licinus Eyles, 1973
 Dieuches lilliputanus Eyles, 1973
 Dieuches linnavuorii Eyles, 1973
 Dieuches longiceps Eyles, 1973
 Dieuches longicollis (Dallas, 1852)
 Dieuches maculicollis (Walker, 1872)
 Dieuches major Eyles, 1973
 Dieuches marginipennis (Stal, 1855)
 Dieuches megalops Eyles, 1973
 Dieuches membranaceus Eyles, 1973
 Dieuches microtropis Eyles, 1973
 Dieuches mixtus Eyles, 1973
 Dieuches modestus Horvath, 1888
 Dieuches mucronatus (Stal, 1865)
 Dieuches neavei Eyles, 1973
 Dieuches neolateralis Scudder, 1962
 Dieuches nitens Eyles, 1973
 Dieuches notatus (Dallas, 1852)
 Dieuches nudus Gross & Scudder, 1963
 Dieuches obscuripes (Walker, 1872)
 Dieuches oceanicus (Distant, 1901)
 Dieuches ochromus Eyles, 1995
 Dieuches opaciclavus Eyles, 1973
 Dieuches ornatus (Distant, 1918)
 Dieuches osellai Carapezza, 2006
 Dieuches pallidocoxis Eyles, 1973
 Dieuches pamelae Eyles, 1973
 Dieuches parallelus Eyles, 1973
 Dieuches parvimaculatus Tomokuni, 1993
 Dieuches parvipictus Distant, 1918
 Dieuches patrizii Mancini, 1948
 Dieuches patruelis (Stal, 1855)
 Dieuches philippinensis Eyles, 1973
 Dieuches pinguis Eyles, 1973
 Dieuches placidus (Stal, 1865)
 Dieuches planus Eyles, 1973
 Dieuches projectus Eyles, 1973
 Dieuches prolixus Eyles, 1973
 Dieuches proximus Eyles, 1973
 Dieuches punctipes Dohrn, 1860
 Dieuches purpureus Eyles, 1973
 Dieuches rectangularis Eyles, 1973
 Dieuches relatus Distant, 1901
 Dieuches rhodesiae Eyles, 1973
 Dieuches riegeri Fábics & Kondorosy, 2014
 Dieuches sagittatus Eyles, 1973
 Dieuches schmitzi Reuter, 1893
 Dieuches scioensis Lethierry, 1881
 Dieuches scudderi Eyles, 1973
 Dieuches scutellatus Distant, 1904
 Dieuches semidolens (Walker, 1870)
 Dieuches siamicus (Walker, 1872)
 Dieuches signatipennis Eyles, 1973
 Dieuches similis Mancini, 1948
 Dieuches slateri Eyles, 1973
 Dieuches sloggetti Distant, 1918
 Dieuches smithi Distant, 1918
 Dieuches solus Eyles, 1973
 Dieuches stenus Eyles, 1973
 Dieuches subcoxalis Eyles, 1973
 Dieuches subvectus Eyles, 1973
 Dieuches suratensis (Distant, 1909)
 Dieuches syriacus Dohrn, 1860
 Dieuches tenuis Eyles, 1973
 Dieuches torpidus Gross & Scudder, 1963
 Dieuches trapeziformis Eyles, 1973
 Dieuches triangulus Eyles, 1973
 Dieuches tropis Eyles, 1973
 Dieuches tuberculatus Mancini, 1948
 Dieuches turneri Eyles, 1973
 Dieuches ugandensis (Distant, 1918)
 Dieuches umbrifer (Stal, 1855)
 Dieuches uniformis Distant, 1904
 Dieuches vexans Schouteden, 1957
 Dieuches vilis Eyles, 1973
 Dieuches virgatus Eyles, 1973
 Dieuches wittei Eyles, 1973

References

Dieuches